The United States Marine Drum & Bugle Corps is the drum and bugle corps of the United States Marine Corps. The D&B is now the only full-time active duty drum corps in the United States Armed Forces. As one of many United States military bands, the United States Marine Drum & Bugle Corps consists of 80 active-duty Marines dressed in ceremonial red and white uniforms. The D&B performs martial and popular music.

The United States Marine Drum & Bugle Corps has been officially designated as "The Commandant's Own" due to the historical connection with the Commandant of the Marine Corps. The D&B is entirely separate from its sister organization, the United States Marine Band ("The President's Own"), as well as the ten active-duty United States Marine Corps field bands. The United States Marine Drum & Bugle Corps travels more than  annually, performing over 400 events worldwide.

During the summer months, the D&B performs in conjunction with "The President's Own" in the traditional Friday Evening Parades at the Marine Barracks Washington, and performs in the Sunset Parades at the Marine Corps War Memorial (Iwo Jima Monument) in Arlington, Virginia, every Tuesday evening. These parades are not street parades, but military parades consisting of ceremonial pomp that are symbolic of Marine professionalism, discipline, and esprit de corps.

Captain Nathan D. Morris is the seventh and current director of "The Commandant's Own" The United States Drum & Bugle Corps, serving in this position since February 2022. Chief Warrant Officer 2 Courtney R. Lawrence is the Executive Officer and Assistant Director. Master Sergeant Joshua Dannemiller is the twenty-third and current Drum Major. Gunnery Sergeant David Cox is the Assistant Drum Major.

History

The unit's history traces to the early days of the Marine Corps. In the 18th and 19th centuries, military musicians ("field musics") provided a means of passing commands to Marines in battle. The sound of various drum beats and bugle calls that could be heard over the noise of the battlefield signaled Marines to attack the enemy or retreat. Through the 1930s, Marine Corps posts still authorized several buglers and drummers to play the traditional calls and to ring a ship's bell to signal the time. Until the 1960s, Marine Corps units sported unit drum and bugle corps within their respective rosters.

"The Commandant's Own" The United States Marine Drum & Bugle Corps, the only such formation within the Armed Forces today, was formed in 1934 at historic Marine Barracks Washington to augment the United States Marine Band "The President's Own". The unit provided musical support to ceremonies around the nation's capital. It was additionally tasked with presidential support duties during World War II. For this additional role, they were awarded the scarlet and gold breast cord by President Franklin Delano Roosevelt, which remains on the uniform. When the war ended, the United States Drum and Bugle Corps resumed performing at various military and public ceremonies.

In the early 1950s, the unit gained considerable acclaim performing for an increasing number of civilian audiences. Originally their instrumentation was similar to the other drum and bugle corps of the era. It has evolved along with the civilian corps, adapting trends after they have become established by the civilian corps. Music composed specifically for their unique selection of instruments helped establish their reputation for excellence during this period. These factors also led to the unit's formal designation as "The Commandant's Own", a title noting their unique status as musicians for the Commandant of the Marine Corps.

In 1968, Truman Crawford, formerly of the United States Air Force Drum and Bugle Corps, became a musical arranger and instructor for The Commandant's Own. During his 30-year career, he had a significant impact on the D&B comparable to that of John Philip Sousa on the United States Marine Band. The primary rehearsal hall of "The Commandant's Own" at Marine Barracks Washington is named Truman Crawford Hall in his honor.

Training

Like the United States Marine Band, prior to enlisting each potential member of the Drum and Bugle Corps, all must pass a competitive audition. Unlike members of the President's Own, Drum and Bugle Corps members do undergo Marine Corps Recruit Training and Marine Combat Training, where they are trained in basic infantry tactics.

Following Recruit Training and Marine Combat Training, Drum and Bugle Corps members proceed directly to "The Commandant's Own". They do not attend Military Occupational Specialty training. The United States Marine Drum and Bugle Corps does not march in parades of state but instead is held back in reserve by the Commandant of the Marine Corps, who may order it anywhere since the corps serves under the Commandant's immediate command.

Uniforms and instruments

The Marines of the United States Marine Drum & Bugle Corps wear red and white uniforms with white gauntlets which cover the wrists and bear and play brass instruments, marching drums, and various front ensemble instruments.

The brass instruments played by "The Commandant's Own" are bugles pitched in G. There are 4 sections within the hornline: Soprano Bugle, Mellophone Bugle, Baritone Bugle, and Contrabass Bugle. In January of 2021 the unit transitioned from the two-valved models utilized by the Drum Corps for decades, to three-valved versions, allowing the brass section to play the complete chromatic scale.

See also

United States military bands

References

External links

Official website
Images from the Defense Video and Imagery Distribution System
Exhibition Performance at the 2016 Drum Corps International Championships

Ceremonial units of the United States military
Drum and bugle corps
Military units and formations of the United States Marine Corps
Bands of the United States Marine Corps
Military units and formations established in 1934
Musical groups established in 1934
Military in Washington, D.C.
1934 establishments in the United States